Algernon Hawkins Thomond Keith-Falconer, 9th Earl of Kintore, 11th Lord Falconer of Halkerton, 9th Lord Keith of Inverurie and Keith Hall, Chief of Clan Keith,  (12 August 1852 – 3 March 1930), was a British politician and colonial governor.

Background and education
Born at Lixmount House, in Trinity, Edinburgh, Keith-Falconer was the eldest son of Francis Keith Falconer, 8th Earl of Kintore and his wife Louisa Madeleine, née Hawkins. He was educated at Eton and Trinity College, Cambridge.

Political career
In 1880, Lord Kintore was the unsuccessful Conservative candidate for Chelsea. He succeeded to his father's titles upon his father's death in 1880, was appointed First Government Whip in the House of Lords in 1885 and was a Lord-in-waiting from 1885 to 1886 and from 1895 to 1905. In 1886, he was invested as a Privy Counsellor. In 1913 he was elected a Senior Deputy Speaker of the House of Lords of the House of Lords.

Governor of South Australia
Lord Kintore was Governor of South Australia between 1889 and 10 April 1895. He was made a Knight-Grand-Cross of the Order of St Michael and St George (GCMG) on his appointment. A freemason, he was also Grand-Master of the United Grand Lodge of South Australia during his term as Governor (1889-1895).

He arrived with his family in South Australia on 11 April 1889 aboard the Orient and was formally welcomed by the administrator, Chief Justice Samuel Way, who later resigned as Grand Master of the United Grand Lodge of South Australia in his favour.

Court, military and later life
Lord Kintore acted as Lord-in-waiting for Queen Victoria for 1885/6 and Edward VII 1901-05. In early 1901 he was asked by King Edward to take part in a special diplomatic mission to announce the King's accession to the governments of Denmark, Sweden and Norway, Russia, Germany, and Saxony.

Lord Kintore was appointed lieutenant-colonel in command of the 3rd (Militia) Battalion of the Gordon Highlanders on 17 October 1891. He also held the honorary rank of colonel. In January 1903 he was appointed an Aide-de-Camp for Militia to the King, and received the substantive rank of colonel in the militia.

He was a Knight of Grand-Cross of the Order of the Crown of Italy of Italy, a 1st Class of the Order of the Red Eagle of Prussia, a Grand-Cross of the Military Order of Our Lord Jesus Christ of Portugal and a Grand-Cross of the Order of the Polar Star of Sweden.

In 1911, Kintore was presented with a royal gift cigarette case by Prince Ferdinand of Bavaria (1884-1958). A century later, the gift featured in the Christie's London sale, SALE 7970 —IMPORTANT JEWELS held on 8 June 2011.

Death
He died on 3 March 1930 aged 77 at 10 Park Place, St James Street, London, of acute bronchitis and periurethral abscess and interred on 7 March 1930 at Keith Hall, Inverurie, Aberdeen. He was survived by his wife, two sons and two daughters.

Family
Lord Kintore married Lady Sydney Charlotte Montagu (14 October 1851 – Keith Hall, Inverurie, Aberdeen, 21 September 1932), second daughter of George Montagu, 6th Duke of Manchester, at St George's, Hanover Square, London, on 14 August 1873.

He was succeeded on the earldom by his second but only surviving son, Arthur. Kintore's daughter Lady Ethel Sydney Keith-Falconer, wife of John Baird, 1st Viscount Stonehaven, eventually inherited the earldom.

Legacy
Places and other items named for Earl Kintore include:
County of Kintore in South Australia in 1890
 The town of Kintore, Northern Territory
 Kintore, Western Australia, now a ghost town.
Kintore's egernia (Liopholis kintorei), an Australian lizard named in 1893.
 Mount Kintore and the Kintore Range in the Northern Territory - named by William Tietkens during his expedition of 1889

See also
 Tietkens expedition of 1889

References

Source

1852 births
1930 deaths
Politicians from Edinburgh
Earls of Kintore
Governors of South Australia
Governors of the Colony of South Australia
Knights Grand Cross of the Order of St Michael and St George
Grand Crosses of the Order of Christ (Portugal)
Commanders Grand Cross of the Order of the Polar Star
Conservative Party (UK) Baronesses- and Lords-in-Waiting
Australian Freemasons
Knights of the Thistle
Members of the Privy Council of the United Kingdom
British colonial governors and administrators in Oceania